David Blakey (29 August 1929 – 4 April 2014) was an English professional footballer who played as a centre half. Blakey spent his entire senior career with Chesterfield. He is the club's record appearance holder, making 617 appearances in the Football League and 658 appearances in all competitions. After retiring as a player he worked as a scout at a number of clubs. He died on 4 April 2014.

References

1929 births
2014 deaths
English footballers
Chesterfield F.C. players
English Football League players
Association football defenders